Sultanat is a 2014 Pakistani action romance film and 30-episode television series created and directed by Syed Faisal Bukhari who had previously directed the top-grossing film Bhai Log and produced by Aslam Bhatti, who also plays the lead role. The film has a multi-star cast including actors from the Indian television industry. It is said to be most expensive film of Pakistani film industry having 22 crore budget. Pakistan's top famous writer Pervaiz Kaleem is writing screenplay and dialogue. Ahmed Afridi is doing editing for this movie and he is handling post production sound designing and visual effects. It will be released as a film and later turned into a television series.
  
The film released on Eid al-Fitr, 2014. in cinemas across Pakistan.

Cast
 Kashif Mehmood
 Deepak Shirke
 Akashdeep Saigal as Tabraiz
 Shweta Tiwari
 Chetan Hansraj as Javaid
 Zainab Qayyum as Zainab
 Ahsan khan
 Javeria Abbasi
 Nayyar Ejaz as Shafi
 Shabbir Jan
 Achint Kaur as Tara
 Mustafa Qureshi as Haji Baba
 Sila Hussein
 Govind Namdev as Gharo Dollor
 Haroon Ashraf
 Raheela Agha
 Ayub Khoso as Dumma
 David Firefly as David
 Aslam Bhatti as Aslam
 Umar Jadoon as himself (Special appearance in item song Sone Di Tawitri)
 Sara Loren as herself (Special appearance in item song Saiyaan)
 Afreen Khan as herself (Special appearance in item song Sone Di Tawitri)

Promotion
The film was promoted in Dubai.

Post-release
Sultanat was panned by critics across the country.
Kamran Jawaid of Dawn named his review, "Movie Review: It doesn't get worse than Saltanat" and gave the film 1 out of 5 stars. Muhammad ShahZaib Siddiqui (@hellozaib) said on Twitter "Over all film is super duper but songs are too much vulgar so please don't watch it with family" Irteza Bhatti (@bhatti_rockstar) review on Twitter "well go nd watch it its super but dnt compare to Indian or any other nd give time to film its superb I love if nd watched twice". Jawaid claimed that it was probably the worst film in the history of cinema and that he had never seen people actually leave the cinema during a movie before this. His final words read, "Definitely not a good way to spend your Eid day – or any other day for that matter."

See also
 List of highest-grossing Pakistani films
 List of Pakistani films of 2014

References

External links
 
 

2014 films
Pakistani action films
2014 action films
2010s Urdu-language films